The 1982–83 Denver Nuggets season was their 16th season, and their seventh in the NBA. The Nuggets head coach was Doug Moe and his assistant coach was Bill Ficke.

In the playoffs, the Nuggets defeated the Phoenix Suns in three games in the First Round, before losing to the San Antonio Spurs in five games in the Semi-finals.

Draft picks

Roster

Regular season

Season standings

Notes
 z, y – division champions
 x – clinched playoff spot

Record vs. opponents

Game log

Regular season

Playoffs

|- align="center" bgcolor="#ffcccc"
| 1
| April 19
| @ Phoenix
| L 108–121
| Kiki VanDeWeghe (32)
| T. R. Dunn (12)
| English, Evans (4)
| Arizona Veterans Memorial Coliseum11,901
| 0–1
|- align="center" bgcolor="#ccffcc"
| 2
| April 21
| Phoenix
| W 113–99
| Kiki VanDeWeghe (26)
| Dan Issel (11)
| Rob Williams (9)
| McNichols Sports Arena15,903
| 1–1
|- align="center" bgcolor="#ccffcc"
| 3
| April 24
| @ Phoenix
| W 117–112 (OT)
| Alex English (42)
| T. R. Dunn (12)
| Dunn, Williams (6)
| Arizona Veterans Memorial Coliseum14,660
| 2–1
|-

|- align="center" bgcolor="#ffcccc"
| 1
| April 26
| @ San Antonio
| L 133–152
| Dan Issel (28)
| T. R. Dunn (11)
| English, Williams (7)
| HemisFair Arena10,116
| 0–1
|- align="center" bgcolor="#ffcccc"
| 2
| April 27
| @ San Antonio
| L 109–126
| Kiki VanDeWeghe (22)
| T. R. Dunn (8)
| Mike Evans (9)
| HemisFair Arena10,690
| 0–2
|- align="center" bgcolor="#ffcccc"
| 3
| April 29
| San Antonio
| L 126–127 (OT)
| Alex English (39)
| Kiki VanDeWeghe (14)
| English, Williams (7)
| McNichols Sports Arena16,965
| 0–3
|- align="center" bgcolor="#ccffcc"
| 4
| May 2
| San Antonio
| W 124–114
| Kiki VanDeWeghe (37)
| Kiki VanDeWeghe (11)
| Alex English (11)
| McNichols Sports Arena15,035
| 1–3
|- align="center" bgcolor="#ffcccc"
| 5
| May 4
| @ San Antonio
| L 105–145
| Billy McKinney (20)
| T. R. Dunn (8)
| Mike Evans (6)
| HemisFair Arena12,736
| 1–4
|-

Awards and records
 Alex English, All-NBA Second Team
 T.R. Dunn, NBA All-Defensive Second Team

Player statistics

Season

Playoffs

Transactions

References

 Nuggets on Basketball Reference

Denver Nuggets seasons
Den
Denver Nugget
Denver Nugget